Cantor is a lunar impact crater that is located on the northern hemisphere on the far side of the Moon. The outer rim of the crater has a distinctly hexagonal shape, and is slightly longer in the north–south direction. The interior walls are multiply terraced, although less so along the western rim. There is a low central peak at the midpoint of the floor.

The terrain surrounding Cantor is heavily impacted with many small craters. The old and heavily eroded crater H. G. Wells is located to the northwest. To the southeast is Kidinnu.

Satellite craters
By convention these features are identified on lunar maps by placing the letter on the side of the crater midpoint that is closest to Cantor.

References

External links
 

Impact craters on the Moon